Kohlsaat may refer to:

People
Christian Cecil Kohlsaat
H. H. Kohlsaat

Other
Kohlsaat, West Virginia, an unincorporated community in Boone County
Cape Kohlsaat, a point on the easternmost island of Franz Josef Land, Russia